Floriane Gnafoua (born 30 January 1996) is a French sprinter. She competed in the 100 metres at the 2016 European Athletics Championships finishing seventh.

International competitions

1Did not finish in the final

Personal bests
Outdoor
100 metres – 11.19 (+0.9 m/s, Angers 2016)
Indoor
60 metres – 7.20 (Belgrade 2017)

References

External links

1996 births
Living people
French female sprinters
Sportspeople from Saint-Cloud
Athletes (track and field) at the 2016 Summer Olympics
Olympic athletes of France
Olympic female sprinters